Basil Hameed (born 15 April 1992) is an Indian-born cricketer who plays for the United Arab Emirates national cricket team. In December 2019, he was named in the One Day International (ODI) squad for the 2019 United Arab Emirates Tri-Nation Series. He made his ODI debut for the UAE, against the United States on 8 December 2019.

In February 2020, he was named in the UAE's Twenty20 International (T20I) squad for the 2020 ACC Western Region T20 qualifier tournament. He made his T20I debut for the UAE, against Iran, on 23 February 2020. In December 2020, he was one of ten cricketers to be awarded with a year-long part-time contract by the Emirates Cricket Board.

In February 2022, in the second match against Oman, Hameed took his first five-wicket haul in ODI cricket.

Personal life
Hameed was born in Panniyankara, Kerala, India. He was "on the verge of playing Ranji Trophy cricket for his native Kerala" before moving to the UAE for work reasons in 2015.  he was an assistant sales manager with Al Nabooda Insurance Brokers (ANIB) and also played cricket for the company team in UAE domestic competitions.

References

External links
 

1992 births
Living people
Cricketers from Kerala
Emirati cricketers
United Arab Emirates One Day International cricketers
United Arab Emirates Twenty20 International cricketers
Indian emigrants to the United Arab Emirates
Indian expatriate sportspeople in the United Arab Emirates
People from Kozhikode district